MV Earl Sigurd is a Ro-Ro vehicle ferry operated by Orkney Ferries. It was built in 1989 by McTay Marine in Bromborough. It is normally used on Outer North Isles services, connecting Kirkwall with Eday, Sanday, Stronsay, Westray, Papay, and North Ronaldsay.

References

External links

1990 ships
Transport in Orkney
Ferries of Scotland